This is a list of Mexican singers:

Female

Aida Cuevas 
Aleida Núñez
Alejandra Guzmán
Alessandra Rosaldo
Alicia Villarreal
Alix Bauer
Amalia Mendoza
Amparo Ochoa
Ana Bárbara
Ana Gabriel
Anahí
Ángela Aguilar
Angélica Aragón
Angélica María
Angélica Rivera
Angélica Vale
Aracely Arámbula
Beatriz Adriana
Belinda Peregrín
Betsy Pecanins
Bianca Marroquín
Bibi Gaytán
Blanca Estela Pavón 
Camila Sodi
Carla Morrison
Celia Cruz
Chavela Vargas
Chayito Valdez
Chiquis Rivera
Concha Michel
Consuelo Velázquez
Cynthia Rodríguez
Dalia Inés
Danna Paola
Daniela Castro
Daniela Luján
Daniela Romo
Denisse Guerrero
Diana Reyes
Dulce María
Edith Márquez
Eiza González
Ely Guerra
Eugenia León
Fey
Flor Silvestre
Gloria Trevi
Graciela Beltrán
Guadalupe Pineda
Irán Castillo
Irma Dorantes
Irma Serrano
Itatí Cantoral
Julieta Venegas
Jenni Rivera
Kimberly Loaiza
Laura Zapata
La Prieta Linda
Lety López
Lila Downs
Lidia Ávila
Litzy
Lola Beltrán
Lorena Herrera
Lucero
Lucía Méndez
Lucha Reyes
Lucha Villa
Lupita D'Alessio
Lynda Thomas
Maite Perroni
Marcela Bovio
Marcela Rubiales
María José
María de Lourdes 
María Victoria
Mariana Garza
Mariana Levy
Mariana Seoane
Maribel Guardia 
Mary Jiménez
Natalia Lafourcade
Nati Cano
Ninel Conde
Niurka Marcos
Paquita la del Barrio
Patricia Manterola
Patricia Navidad
Paulina Rubio
Paty Cantú
Pilar Montenegro
Tania Libertad
Tatiana
Tehua
Thalía
Verónica Castro
Sasha Sokol 
Selena
Yolanda Perez
Ximena Sariñana
Yolanda Pérez
Yuri
Yuridia

Male

Adán Sánchez 
Adolfo Urías
Agustín Lara
Agustín Arana 
Alejandro Fernández
Alejandro Ibarra
Aleks Syntek
Ariel Camacho
Arturo Meza
Álex Lora
Alexander Acha
Alfonso Herrera
Alfredo Olivas
Antonio Aguilar
Antonio Aguilar Jr.
Armando Manzanero
Baby Bash
Benito Castro
Benny Ibarra
Beto Quintanilla
Bobby Larios
Caloncho
Carlos Santana 
Celso Piña
Cepillín
César Costa
Claudio Bermudez
Cristian Castro
Chalino Sánchez
Chetes
Chico Che
Christian Nodal
Christopher Uckerman
Cornelio Reyna
Cuco Sánchez
David Cavazos
David Záizar
Diego Schoening
Eduardo Capetillo
El Coyote
El Chapo de Sinaloa
El Potro de Sinaloa
Emmanuel
Enrique Guzmán
Erik Rubin
Espinoza Paz
Eulalio González
Felipe Arriaga
Fernando Delgadillo
Fernando de la Mora
Fher Olvera
Francisco Gabilondo Soler
Frankie J
Gualberto Castro
Gerardo Ortíz
Gerardo Reyes
Germán Valdés
Guillermo Velázquez
Imanol Landeta
Jaime Camil
Javier Solís
Jean Duverger
Jessie Morales
Jesús Rasgado 
Joan Sebastian
Jorge Negrete
José Alfredo Jiménez
José Ángel Espinoza
José Guadalupe Esparza
José José
José Mojica
José Manuel Figueroa
Juan Gabriel
Juan Mendoza
Juan Rivera
Julión Álvarez 
Julio Preciado
Kalimba
Larry Hernandez
Leonardo Aguilar
Lorenzo de Monteclaro
Luis Coronel
Luis Miguel
Luis Pérez Meza
Lupillo Rivera
Marco Antonio Muñiz
Marco Antonio Solís
Miguel Aceves Mejía
Óscar Chávez
Pablo Montero
Pedro Infante
Pepe Aguilar
Pedro Fernández
Polo Urías
Ramón Ayala
Regulo Caro
Remmy Valenzuela
Reyli
Rigo Tovar
Roberto Cantoral
Roberto Gomez Bolaños
Roberto Tapia
Salvador Flores Rivera
Samo
Saul Hernández
Sergio Gómez
Sergio Vega
Tito Guízar
Tito Torbellino
Valentin Elizalde
Vicente Fernández
Yahir Othon

 
Mexican